Božena Němcová (4 February 1820 in Vienna – 21 January 1862 in Prague) was a Czech writer of the final phase of the Czech National Revival movement.

Her image is featured on the 500 CZK denomination of the Česká koruna.

Biography
According to the dating up to now accepted by the majority of Czech authors, Božena Němcová was born in 1820 as Barbara Pankel (or Barbora Panklová according to the usual Czech name-giving for women) in Vienna as a daughter of Johann Pankel from Lower Austria and Teresie Novotná, a maid of Bohemian origin. In her childhood she lived near the small town of Ratibořice, where her grandmother Magdalena Novotná played an important part in her life. Němcová would later write her most famous novel with the main character inspired by her grandmother.

When she was 17 years old, she married Josef Němec, fifteen years her senior, who worked as a customs officer and was therefore a state employee. The marriage was arranged by Barbora's parents and became an unhappy one, as the married couple did not understand each other very well. Němec was said to be a rude and authoritarian man. He was a Bohemian patriot, which did not sit well with his superiors, and he was often transferred to different locations and later lost his job. The couple had four children and suffered from a lack of money. Němcová died in poverty, estranged from her husband. She is said to have been in an intimate relationship with the poet Václav Bolemír Nebeský. The Bohemian patriots arranged a magnificent funeral for her.

Speculations on Božena Němcová's real origin 
Some authors question the birthdate (the preserved documents differ) and the real origin of Božena Němcová. According to one hypothesis, Němcová could have been born three to four years earlier than previously thought, and been an illegitimate daughter of Wilhelmine, Duchess of Sagan (1781–1839). Helena Sobková, a writer of popular-history books about Němcová, believes that Němcová may actually have been the niece of Wilhelmine. In 1816 an illegitimate daughter was born to Wilhelmine's younger sister, Dorothée de Talleyrand-Périgord, and Count Karl Johann of Clam-Martinic (1792–1840) in Bourbon-l'Archambault (a French spa). The child was not officially recognized by its mother; it was registered as Marie-Henriette Dessalles. The child's further fate is unknown, and it is possible that Duchess Wilhelmine of Sagan later gave the girl to Němcová's parents to raise her as their own child under the name Barbora Panklová.

None of these speculations, however, have been definitely proven by serious historical research.

Bibliography

Novels 
 Babička (The Grandmother) (1855) – Němcová's best-known novel about a young girl named Barunka (a pet form of Barbora) and her childhood with her grandmother in the countryside. The book was inspired by Němcová's own childhood in the village of Ratibořice, where she lived with her parents, siblings and maternal grandmother Magdalena Novotná.
 Pohorská vesnice (The village under mountains) (1855)

Fairy tales and legends 
 Chýše pod horami
 O dvanácti měsíčkách
 Národní báchorky a pověsti (National Stories and Legends)
 Slovenské pohádky a pověsti (Slovak Fairy Tales and Legends)
 Selská politika (Country Politics)
 Hospodyně na slovíčko
 Dopisy z lázní Františkových (The Letters from Franzenbad)
 Listy přítele přítelkyni
 Silný Ctibor
 Devět křížů (Nine Crosses)

References

External links
 

1820 births
1862 deaths
19th-century women writers
Austrian people of Czech descent
Writers from Vienna
Czech women poets
Czech women novelists
19th-century Czech novelists
19th-century Czech poets
Burials at Vyšehrad Cemetery